Shafey Kidwai (born 8 April 1960) is an  Indian academic,  bilingual critic,  translator,  columnist,  and author. He is the professor  in the Department of Mass Communications at Aligarh Muslim University. He has written twelve books in English and Urdu. His seminal study, Sir Syed Ahmad Khan, Reason, Religion and Nation (Routledge,2020) has got wide acclaim across the globe.   He writes for The Hindustan Times, The Indian Express,  The Hindu, The Frontline, The Outlook, Indian Literature,    The Book Review, The Stateman, and Siyasat.com .Reputed literary journals of the subcontinent carry his articles regularly and he  is often regarded as one of the best modern academic critics in Urdu.

He studied at Lucknow and Varanasi and lives in Aligarh with his wife Shaista Faridi, son Shaghil Kidwai and his elder son Sharif Kidwai works for Apple Inc and settled in the United States . He is grandson of famous author Maulana Abdul Majid Daryabadi. He participates in seminars and literary festivals regularly.Shafey kidwai was a member of the General Council of Sahitya academy and National Council for the promotion of Urdu. He was the convener of Bhasha Samiti(Urdu)Saraswati Samman and Bhartiya Jnanpith.         

His 2017 work Sawaneh-e-Sir Syed: Ek Bazdeed - a biography of Sir Syed won the 2019  Sahitya Akademi Award for Urdu. A previous work Urdu Literature and Journalism: Critical Perspective was published by Cambridge University Press India. With this well-researched source of information, Shafey Kidwai has turned a new page in the history of Urdu journalism. 

In 2018, Kidwai was awarded the Iqbal Samman by the Government of Madhya Pradesh for his service to promotion of Urdu literature. UP Urdu Academy has also conferred its highest literary honour Khusro Award to him in 2018. He is a bilingual critic and communication expert and his fortnightly column on literature, Culture and media Going Native appears in the Friday Review, The Hindu. He is the chief editor of Aligarh Journal of Communication and he is on the editorial board of several peer-reviewed communicational journals including research journal jointly published by University of Purdue and Kolkata.

Books  
SirSyedAhmad Khan: Reason, Religion and Nation ( Routledge,2020)
 Aligarh Institute Gazette An Analytical Study(Brown Books, 2021),
 *Sawaneh SirSyed:Ek Bazdeed, Sahita Academy award, 2019, (Brown Books 2017)
RK Naryan(translation, SahiytaAcademy, 2017) 
 *MabaadJadded fiction:Pas Sakhtiyati Tanazur(Brown Books2017)
Urdu Literature and Journalism: Critical Perspective(Cambridge University Press India, 2014)
 National Awakening and Maulana Azad with special reference to Alhilal(Ranch University,2012)
 Meeraji (Monograph, Makers of India Series, Sahita Academy, 1998) 
 Khabar Nigari (1988)
 Michal Madhusudan Dutt (translation. Sahiyta Academy,1992)

 The Terminology of Mass Communication in Urdu(national council for promotion of Urdu, New Delhi,2003)

See also
 Abdul Majid Daryabadi, grandfather of Shafey Kidwai

References

 Recipients of the Sahitya Akademi Award in Urdu
1960 births
 Living people